Harold James may refer to:

 Harold James (archer) (1868–1948), British archer
 Harold James (Pennsylvania politician) (born 1942), member of the Pennsylvania House of Representatives
 Harold James (historian) (born 1956), economic historian
 Gene James (Harold Gene James, 1925–1997), American basketball player
 Harold James (basketball coach), former Oklahoma A&M basketball coach

See also
 Harry James (disambiguation)